Si-Donyi is the major festival celebrated among the Tagin tribe of Arunachal Pradesh in North-eastern India. It is celebrated majorly in district headquarter Daporijo, in adjoining town Dumporijo and in Taliha, Siyum areas, also in state capital Itanagar, while in other places also it's being celebrated by Tagin  community  present there.
The festival was first conceptualised in the year 1975 by Late Tatar Uli, who was the main pioneer in inception of Si-Donyi. The other members who bore the responsibilities were Late Tadak Dulom and Popak Bage. The festival was celebrated in the same year under their guidance, and since then, the festival Si-donyi has been celebrated by the Tagin tribe.
The first priest who led the ritual was Dubi Nogam. Further the name Si-Donyi was suggested by Shri. Bingsa Kodak.

Duration

It is celebrated from the 4 to 6 January every year. During the festival god Si (Atu Si-male spiritual form of earth)  and goddess Donyi (Ayu Donyi-female spiritual form of Sun) is being venerated in their spiritual form.

Rituals

Nibu or the local priest presides over the festival by chanting UI (a form of verbal prayers) to the deities, Si and Donyi in particular. For the prosperity of entire community, to stop malevolent spirits from creating destruction towards the people of community  and to ask permission for quality crops and health.

Sehtu A platform constructed of bamboos and wood, decorated with required  leaves and bamboo stuffs (Nyûgé). The entire hyms and chanting and ghayal sacrifice is done around here.

Another key component is dancing; dances such as Chungne, Konyi Bokar, Riabu, and Takar Ghene are performed by the groups of men and women in their traditional attires and ornaments. While older male perform Hoyi Penam which is a specially performed to welcome the spirits.

While essentially Etțě, a paste made of rice beer and rice powder is smeared on peoples' faces in celebration.

The Mithun gayal is sacrificed for the deities marking the end of festival, while celebration continues for weeks.

Etymology
It is celebrated to venerate the Si (the Earth) and the Donyi (the Sun), the chief deities among the Donyi-Poloism followed by the Tagin. The male spirit form of the Si god and the female spirit form of the Donyi goddess are worshipped.

References

Donyi-Polo
Religious festivals in India
Festivals in Arunachal Pradesh